Denmark competed at the 2006 Winter Olympics in Turin, Italy, but only competed in one sport: women's curling. Denmark's only medal at the Winter Olympics came in women's curling in 1998.

Curling

The Danish team consisted of the following five women: Denise Dupont, Dorthe Holm, Malene Krause, Lene Nielsen and Maria Poulsen.

Women's

Team: Dorthe Holm, Denise Dupont, Lene Nielsen, Malene Krause and Maria Poulsen (alternate)

Round Robin
Draw 1
;Draw 3
;Draw 4
;Draw 5
;Draw 6
;Draw 8
;Draw 10
;Draw 11
;Draw 12

Standings

References

Nations at the 2006 Winter Olympics
2006 Winter Olympics
Winter Olympics